4 Regiment RLC is a regiment of the British Army's Royal Logistic Corps.

History 
The regiment was formed before World War I and was titled as 4th Regiment, Royal Logistic Corps.  From 1993 to 1994, the regiment was involved in Operation Grapple 3 in Bosnia and Herzegovina.  From 2003 to 2004, the regiment was on operations in Iraq on Operation Telic.  In 2005, it was renamed as 4 Logistic Support Regiment. In 2018, the regiment supported operations in Ukraine and Estonia. It also provided support at home during the COVID-19 pandemic in the United Kingdom.

Structure 
The current regimental structure is as follows:

 75 Headquarters Squadron
 4 Close Support Squadron
 33 General Support Squadron
 Royal Electrical and Mechanical Engineers Light Aid Detachment

References

External links 
 Official Website

Regiments of the Royal Logistic Corps